Papa Gueye (born 7 June 1984) is a former Senegalese professional footballer who played as a centre-back and current football coach at Metalist Kharkiv.

Career

Born in Dakar, Senegal, Gueye grew up in a family of school director (father) and a teacher (mother). He started playing football at 6 years old, attending a football club at school. In 1999, he enrolled in the school football club AS Douanes (Senegal).

Metalist Kharkiv
In 2006 Gueye moved from Volyn Lutsk to Metalist Kharkiv where he played as a central defender and a defensive midfielder. After more than 10 years in Kharkiv he signed a contract with Dnipro Dnipropetrovsk.

Rostov
On 31 August 2016, Gueye signed for Russian Premier League side FC Rostov.

FC Aktobe
On 23 February 2017, Gueye signed for Kazakhstan Premier League side FC Aktobe.

Dnipro-1
In 2019 he moved from  Karpaty Lviv to Dnipro-1.

International
When the Metalist coach Myron Markevych was placed as the head coach of the Ukraine national football team in 2010, there were talks of naturalization of Gueye.

Career statistics

Club

International

Honours
Metalist Kharkiv
Ukrainian Second League: 2020-21

Dnipro Dnipropetrovsk
UEFA Europa League Runners-up: 2014–15

Gallery

References

External links

 FC Metalist Kharkiv Player Profile

Living people
1984 births
Footballers from Dakar
Association football central defenders
Senegalese footballers
Senegalese expatriate footballers
Expatriate footballers in Ukraine
Senegalese expatriate sportspeople in Ukraine
Ukrainian Premier League players
Ukrainian Second League players
Russian Premier League players
Kazakhstan Premier League players
AS Douanes (Senegal) players
FC Volyn Lutsk players
FC Metalist Kharkiv players
FC Dnipro players
FC Rostov players
FC Aktobe players
FC Karpaty Lviv players
SC Dnipro-1 players
Olympic footballers of Senegal
Footballers at the 2012 Summer Olympics
Expatriate footballers in Russia
Senegalese expatriate sportspeople in Russia
Expatriate footballers in Kazakhstan
Senegalese expatriate sportspeople in Kazakhstan
Senegal international footballers